The Two Poor Boys were an American, Tennessee based, folk-blues duo  consisting of Joe Evans and Arthur McLain (or McClain) who recorded between 1927 and 1931.  Their songs typically featured Evans' laid-back vocals, with a musical approach based on “beautifully matched guitar and mandolin accompaniment”. On some records they were listed under the pseudonyms, 'Colman and Harper'. Between the two of them, they played an array of instruments including guitar, kazoo, piano, mandolin and violin.

Collected songs

Tracks 2-13 recorded May 20, 1931; tracks 14-20 recorded May 21, 1931, in New York City.

References

American blues musical groups
American folk singers
American mandolinists
American musical duos